= Samarda Kaliyasot =

Samarda Kaliyasot Kaliasot
- village
- Location within Madhya Pradesh Location within India
- Coordinates: 23.115792°N 77.503701°E
- Country: India
- State: Madhya Pradesh
- District: Bhopal
- Tehsil: Kolar

Population (2011)
  - Total: 5,167
- Time zone: UTC+5:30 (IST)
- ISO 3166 code: MP-IN
- Census code: 482559

Samarda Kaliyasot is a village in the Bhopal district of Madhya Pradesh, India. It is located in the Huzur tehsil and the Phanda block.

== Demographics ==
According to the 2011 census of India, Samarda Kaliyasot has 1202 households. The effective literacy rate (i.e. the literacy rate of population excluding children aged 6 and below) is 88.96%.

Demographics (2011 Census)
	Total	Male	Female
Population	5167	2697	2470
Children aged below 6 years	728	381	347
Scheduled caste	436	230	206
Scheduled tribe	248	130	118
Literates	3949	2143	1806
Workers (all)	1579	1338	241
Main workers (total)	1505	1288	217
Main workers: Cultivators	104	86	18
Main workers: Agricultural labourers	50	33	17
Main workers: Household industry workers	42	35	7
Main workers: Other	1309	1134	175
Marginal workers (total)	74	50	24
Marginal workers: Cultivators	8	4	4
Marginal workers: Agricultural labourers	8	7	1
Marginal workers: Household industry workers	4	1	3
Marginal workers: Others	54	38	16
Non-workers	3588	1359	2229
